Saratovsky (masculine), Saratovskaya (feminine), or Saratovskoye (neuter) is the name of several rural localities in Russia:
Saratovsky, Republic of Adygea, a khutor in Krasnogvardeysky District of the Republic of Adygea
Saratovsky, Kugarchinsky District, Republic of Bashkortostan, a khutor in Isimovsky Selsoviet of Kugarchinsky District of the Republic of Bashkortostan
Saratovsky, Zilairsky District, Republic of Bashkortostan, a khutor in Dmitriyevsky Selsoviet of Zilairsky District of the Republic of Bashkortostan
Saratovsky, Kabardino-Balkar Republic, a khutor in Prokhladnensky District of the Kabardino-Balkar Republic
Saratovsky, Krasnodar Krai, a khutor in Bratsky Rural Okrug of Ust-Labinsky District of Krasnodar Krai
Saratovsky, Stavropol Krai, a khutor in Kazminsky Selsoviet of Kochubeyevsky District of Stavropol Krai
Saratovskoye, Russia, a settlement in Vesnovsky Rural Okrug of Krasnoznamensky District of Kaliningrad Oblast
Saratovskaya (rural locality), a stanitsa in Saratovsky Rural Okrug under the administrative jurisdiction of the Town of Goryachy Klyuch, Krasnodar Krai